Samaritan is a novel by Richard Price, first published in 2003. It tells the story of a wealthy screenwriter who returns to his impoverished neighborhood in Dempsey, New Jersey, where he begins to help others. His motivations and their ramifications are explored. Throughout the novel, various characters help others, with each good deed having different repercussions.

Setting
Dempsey – A fictional city that is the setting for most of Richard Price's books. The residents are predominantly African-American and poor. Price based Dempsey on the real city of Jersey City, but felt that by fictionalizing it, he would have more freedom to create characters and settings.
Dempsey Housing Projects – A set of buildings in Dempsey where much of the novel takes place.
Little Venice - An affluent area that appears to have a predominantly elderly Jewish population.

Plot summary

As the novel opens, Ray Mitchell is lying in a hospital, having been attacked and gravely injured by being hit over the head with a large vase. He refuses to press charges and it appears he will survive, so the police drop the case. However, an old friend of his from childhood, Nerese Ammons, pays a visit to her (and Ray's) old high school, to give a talk to the kids, and the principal tells her of a man who has been volunteer teaching at the school, and who was almost killed in an attack. When Nerese learns that the man involved is Ray, she is pleased. Nerese has a philosophy of always repaying acts of kindness—it helps her make sense of the world, and Ray once did her a great kindness: when she was around 10 years old and Ray around 12, she received a bad cut on her face during a game of stickball, causing all of the children present to run away... except Ray. He stanched the blood with his shirt, helped take her to the hospital, and sat with her and comforted her throughout the ER visit. She therefore begins to pursue the case, despite Ray's refusal to cooperate and refusal to press charges. The novel then alternates between  scenes of the events leading up to the attack, and Nerese's investigations.

When Ray leaves his job as a TV writer, he becomes unemployed so volunteers as a writing teacher at his old high school, where he says encouraging words to his students, though may not be teaching them much. He has an extreme need to please people and make them feel better, and in return be given gratitude. One day an old student from 10 years earlier, Selim, shows up. He was once a promising art student and Ray set him up with an appointment at an art school and gave him a lot of art supplies, but Selim never showed up for his interview and did not pursue the lead. Selim has been in jail for the past six years, largely because he handles situations badly and makes stupid mistakes. He spins a story of aspirations he has, but Ray can see right away that he's not trustworthy and his stories don't hold together. Nevertheless, he can't help himself and he gives him $1000 to help him get on his feet.

Prior to the attack, Ray was trying to forge a relationship with his daughter, Ruby. Their relationship was awkward because for the first few  years of her life, he was a cocaine addict. Then he was kicked out of the house by his wife, and seldom saw Ruby. He cleaned up from the drugs, then had a relapse, until an old student of his from his days as a teacher offers him a job as a writer on a TV show in Hollywood. Ray cleans up and moves out to California, and therefore does not see Ruby much. Now that he is back, his interactions with her are awkward, with him trying to buy her things and being overly solicitous. When an old acquaintance from childhood, Carla Powell, calls him up to tell him her son has died and asks if he can help donate funds for the funeral, Ray, seeing a way to impress his daughter, impulsively decides to give her the full amount of $3200, which he does in person, at her Dempsey housing project apartment, with a flourish, so his daughter will see and appreciate. But his gesture does not go as well as planned. His daughter is a little disturbed by the surroundings, and senses the real reason for his generosity. Carla, who is a proud woman, is humiliated by the gift, and insists she will pay him back. And Carla's daughter, Danielle, also seems to see through him.

However, Ray ends up dating Danielle, though does not believe her assertions that her husband will be in jail for a long time. Ray realizes Danielle is just using him to make her husband jealous and that she is trouble, despite her frequent assertions of high aspirations. Danielle brings her son Nelson to Ray's home many times, sometimes using him as a babysitter, and Ray plays catch with him, buys  him books, and pays him a lot of attention. Ray can't bring himself to break it off with her despite all of the red flags—he does not like to disappoint people.

Meanwhile, Selim comes back to see Ray, full of another tale of woe and with a scheme to set up a business. Ray sees through him but funds him for $7300.  Then Selim comes back with more problems, and Ray gives him $4500.

Freddy Martin, about to get out of jail, threatens Ray to stay away from his wife, so Ray immediately breaks it off with Danielle. Shortly thereafter, Nelson comes to see Ray, wanting to stay with him, and play with him some more. Ray, knowing he would be risking his life to spend time with Nelson, insists Nelson leave.

Meanwhile, Nerese has her own tales of issues resulting from people doing good deeds. When she was 13, she got in trouble for painting graffiti, and was humiliated in public by jeering children and the behavior of her mother when she was taken into custody. However, a cop that sat with her during her arrest gave her a brief and reassuring squeeze and pat on the back. That single humane gesture at the darkest moment of her life, to show her that someone cared about her, transformed her life. It set her on the path to become a cop in his honor.  Nerese has continued her attitude of always trying to help others. She takes responsibility for several other people—her teen son Darren; her ex-father-in-law, a 97-year-old man with dementia who complains  no matter what she does, but who she cannot turn away; her nephew; and her drug dealer brothers. And she decided when her son was around six years old that she would never bring another man into the house, because it troubled her son to keep having new "daddies". She gave up that aspect of her life, without anyone knowing and with no reward, for the benefit of her son.

One of the people Nerese and Ray meet is "White Tom" Potenza, a former drug addict who now acts as a major force for good in the neighborhood, helping numerous people get off of drugs, and keeping kids safe in the neighborhood. His philosophy is that everything happens according to god's plan; that even when bad things happen, there really are good things behind it, like when he got beaten so bad he almost died and suffers from intense chronic pain, yet the beating is what led him to get off of drugs, meet his wife, and start on his current path as a drug counselor and savior to many.

Finally, in her investigations, Nerese is able to interview Nelson Martin. She feels that Freddy Martin was the attacker, and that if she questions Nelson the right way, he will reveal crucial information to rat his father out. However, unexpectedly, in the interview she learns that the attack was carried out by Nelson himself, because he was angry that Ray had deserted him.

Ray decides to move back to LA, which will break Ruby's heart. His pattern has been to make grand gestures to inspire gratitude, but to fail in the day-to-day activities. However, something that happens during one of his classes changes his mind, and he decides to stay.

Ray receives one final visit from Selim, but Ray rejects him, upsetting Selim. Ray realizes that his desire to help has narcissistic impulses. An ugly confrontation ensues and Selim leaves, whereupon he tries to mug a cab driver but is caught by police. He calls Ray to ask for bail, and Ray bails him out for $2500. Afterwards, Selim tells Ray that if he only had given him the $1000 he wanted the night before, he could have saved $1500 by not needing bail.

Characters
Ray Mitchell - A 43-year-old Jewish man who grew up in the Dempsey housing projects. Following years as a cocaine addict taxi driver and high school English teacher, Ray hit it big in Hollywood as a TV writer. He abruptly left that life and moved back to New Jersey, where he lives off his earnings and tries to forge a relationship with his daughter while also playing at being a good samaritan.
Ruby Mitchell - Ray's young teen daughter who he is trying to forge a relationship with after being a bad father for a number of years
Nerese Ammons - Ray's childhood acquaintance who he once helped greatly, she is now a 41-year-old black Dempsey police officer soon to retire
Carla Powell - She grew up in the Dempsey housing projects and still lives there in her late 40s; Danielle is her only daughter
Danielle Powell Martin - the 31-year-old, beautiful daughter of Carla, she works hard to make something better of her life; she is married to Freddy Martin, a drug dealer
Frederick "Freddy" Martin - a college graduate, drug dealer, and police informant who is in and out of prison, Freddy is extremely intelligent, crafty, and dangerous. 
Nelson Martin - Carla and Freddy's only child, a 12-year-old, bookish, sensitive boy who is neglected by his father and treated brusquely by his mother
Selim Alamein - A former student of Ray's
"White Tom" Potenza - A former drug addict who now helps others get clean.

Major themes
 The price of being a good samaritan
 The subconscious motivations that underlie a desire to help others
 The unforeseen consequences of acting

Awards and nominations

Adaptation

References

External links

2003 American novels
American crime novels
Novels by Richard Price (writer)
Alfred A. Knopf books